Sharon Chisom Ezeamaka is a Nigerian actress and a feminist. Starting as a child artist, she was in the television serials Shuga, Kala & Jamal, and Dorathy My Love. Apart from acting, she is also a producer, model, and television personality.

Personal life
Ezeamaka lamented in 2012, during an interview with Showtime Celebrity that people still treat her as a baby despite being 20 years old. She said, "I have been acting since I was 5, and even though I’m 20 now, people still see me as that little girl. So, I took a two-year break to do other things, get more mature, and explore other areas of the media. I worked in a fashion magazine for about a year, FAB magazine. After that, I took a break before I debuted on the M-net show, The Johnsons. On the Johnsons, I play a really young character who is fifteen". She stated that she does not have time for boys.

Filmography

References

External links
 

Living people
Nigerian film actresses
Nigerian television actresses
People from Lagos State
Nigerian female models
Actresses from Lagos
Year of birth missing (living people)
Nigerian feminists
Nigerian television personalities
Nigerian women film producers
Nigerian film producers
21st-century Nigerian actresses